Li Guangxu (born 11 November 1985) is a Chinese alpine skier. He competed in two events at the 2006 Winter Olympics.

References

1985 births
Living people
Chinese male alpine skiers
Olympic alpine skiers of China
Alpine skiers at the 2006 Winter Olympics
Sportspeople from Heilongjiang
21st-century Chinese people